In mathematics, computer science and network science, network theory is a part of graph theory. It defines networks as graphs where the nodes or edges possess attributes. Network theory analyses these networks over the symmetric relations or asymmetric relations between their (discrete) components.

Network theory has applications in many disciplines, including statistical physics, particle physics, computer science, electrical engineering, biology, archaeology, economics, finance, operations research, climatology, ecology, public health, sociology, and neuroscience. Applications of network theory include logistical networks, the World Wide Web, Internet, gene regulatory networks, metabolic networks, social networks, epistemological networks, etc.; see List of network theory topics for more examples.

Euler's solution of the Seven Bridges of Königsberg problem is considered to be the first true proof in the theory of networks.

Network optimization 
Network problems that involve finding an optimal way of doing something are studied as combinatorial optimization. Examples include network flow, shortest path problem, transport problem, transshipment problem, location problem, matching problem, assignment problem, packing problem,  routing problem, critical path analysis, and program evaluation and review technique.

Network analysis

Electric network analysis 
The analysis of electric power systems could be conducted using network theory from two main points of view:
 An abstract perspective (i.e., as a graph consists from nodes and edges), regardless of the electric power aspects (e.g., transmission line impedances). Most of these studies focus only on the abstract structure of the power grid using node degree distribution and betweenness distribution, which introduces substantial insight regarding the vulnerability assessment of the grid. Through these types of studies, the category of the grid structure could be identified from the complex network perspective (e.g., single-scale, scale-free). This classification might help the electric power system engineers in the planning stage or while upgrading the infrastructure (e.g., add a new transmission line) to maintain a proper redundancy level in the transmission system.
 Weighted graphs that blend an abstract understanding of complex network theories and electric power systems properties.

Social network analysis
Social network analysis examines the structure of relationships between social entities. These entities are often persons, but may also be groups, organizations, nation states, web sites, or scholarly publications.

Since the 1970s, the empirical study of networks has played a central role in social science, and many of the mathematical and statistical tools used for studying networks have been first developed in sociology.  Amongst many other applications, social network analysis has been used to understand the diffusion of innovations, news and rumors.  Similarly, it has been used to examine the spread of both diseases and health-related behaviors.  It has also been applied to the study of markets, where it has been used to examine the role of trust in exchange relationships and of social mechanisms in setting prices.  It has been used to study recruitment into political movements, armed groups, and other social organizations.   It has also been used to conceptualize scientific disagreements as well as academic prestige.  More recently, network analysis (and its close cousin traffic analysis) has gained a significant use in military intelligence, for uncovering insurgent networks of both hierarchical and leaderless nature.

Biological network analysis

With the recent explosion of publicly available high throughput biological data, the analysis of molecular networks has gained significant interest. The type of analysis in this context is closely related to social network analysis, but often focusing on local patterns in the network. For example, network motifs are small subgraphs that are over-represented in the network. Similarly, activity motifs are patterns in the attributes of nodes and edges in the network that are over-represented given the network structure. Using networks to analyze patterns in biological systems, such as food-webs, allows us to visualize the nature and strength of interactions between species. The analysis of biological networks with respect to diseases has led to the development of the field of network medicine.  Recent examples of application of network theory in biology include applications to understanding the cell cycle as well as a quantitative framework for developmental processes.

Narrative network analysis 

The automatic parsing of textual corpora has enabled the extraction of actors and their relational networks on a vast scale. The resulting narrative networks, which can contain thousands of nodes, are then analyzed by using tools from Network theory to identify the key actors, the key communities or parties, and general properties such as robustness or structural stability of the overall network, or centrality of certain nodes. This automates the approach introduced by Quantitative Narrative Analysis, whereby subject-verb-object triplets are identified with pairs of actors linked by an action, or pairs formed by actor-object.

Link analysis
Link analysis is a subset of network analysis, exploring associations between objects. An example may be examining the addresses of suspects and victims, the telephone numbers they have dialed, and financial transactions that they have partaken in during a given timeframe, and the familial relationships between these subjects as a part of police investigation. Link analysis here provides the crucial relationships and associations between very many objects of different types that are not apparent from isolated pieces of information. Computer-assisted or fully automatic computer-based link analysis is increasingly employed by banks and insurance agencies in fraud detection, by telecommunication operators in telecommunication network analysis, by medical sector in epidemiology and pharmacology, in law enforcement investigations, by search engines for relevance rating (and conversely by the spammers for spamdexing and by business owners for search engine optimization), and everywhere else where relationships between many objects have to be analyzed. Links are  also derived from similarity of time behavior in both nodes. Examples include climate networks where the links between two locations (nodes) are determined, for example, by the similarity of the rainfall or temperature fluctuations in both sites.

Web link analysis
Several Web search ranking algorithms use link-based centrality metrics, including Google's PageRank, Kleinberg's HITS algorithm, the CheiRank and TrustRank algorithms. Link analysis is also conducted in information science and communication science in order to understand and extract information from the structure of collections of web pages. For example, the analysis might be of the interlinking between politicians' websites or blogs. Another use is for classifying pages according to their mention in other pages.

Centrality measures
Information about the relative importance of nodes and edges in a graph can be obtained through centrality measures, widely used in disciplines like sociology. For example, eigenvector centrality uses the eigenvectors of the adjacency matrix corresponding to a network, to determine nodes that tend to be frequently visited. Formally established measures of centrality are degree centrality, closeness centrality, betweenness centrality, eigenvector centrality, subgraph centrality, and Katz centrality. The purpose or objective of analysis generally determines the type of centrality measure to be used. For example, if one is interested in dynamics on networks or the robustness of a network to node/link removal, often the dynamical importance  of a node is the most relevant centrality measure.

Assortative and disassortative mixing

These concepts are used to characterize the linking preferences of hubs in a network. Hubs are nodes which have a large number of links. Some hubs tend to link to other hubs while others avoid connecting to hubs and prefer to connect to nodes with low connectivity. We say a hub is assortative when it tends to connect to other hubs. A disassortative hub avoids connecting to other hubs. If hubs have connections with the expected random probabilities, they are said to be neutral. There are three methods to quantify degree correlations.

Recurrence networks
The recurrence matrix of a recurrence plot can be considered as the adjacency matrix of an undirected and unweighted network. This allows for the analysis of time series by network measures. Applications range from detection of regime changes over characterizing dynamics to synchronization analysis.

Spatial networks 
Many real networks are embedded in space. Examples include, transportation and other infrastructure networks, brain neural networks. Several models for spatial networks have been developed.

Spread 
Content in a complex network can spread via two major methods: conserved spread and non-conserved spread.  In conserved spread, the total amount of content that enters a complex network remains constant as it passes through.  The model of conserved spread can best be represented by a pitcher containing a fixed amount of water being poured into a series of funnels connected by tubes.  Here, the pitcher represents the original source and the water is the content being spread.  The funnels and connecting tubing represent the nodes and the connections between nodes, respectively.  As the water passes from one funnel into another, the water disappears instantly from the funnel that was previously exposed to the water.  In non-conserved spread, the amount of content changes as it enters and passes through a complex network.  The model of non-conserved spread can best be represented by a continuously running faucet running through a series of funnels connected by tubes.  Here, the amount of water from the original source is infinite. Also, any funnels that have been exposed to the water continue to experience the water even as it passes into successive funnels.  The non-conserved model is the most suitable for explaining the transmission of most infectious diseases, neural excitation, information and rumors, etc.

Network Immunization
The question of how to immunize efficiently scale free networks which represent realistic networks such as the Internet and social networks has been studied extensively. One such strategy is to immunize the largest  degree nodes, i.e., targeted (intentional) attacks  since for this case  is relatively high and fewer nodes are needed to be immunized. 
However, in most realistic networks the global structure is not available and the  largest degree nodes are unknown.

See also 

Complex network
Congestion game
Quantum complex network
Dual-phase evolution
Network partition
Network science
Network theory in risk assessment
Network topology
Network analyzer
Seven Bridges of Königsberg
Small-world networks
Social network
Scale-free networks
Network dynamics
Sequential dynamical systems
Pathfinder networks
Human disease network
Biological network
Network medicine
Graph partition

References

Books

External links 

netwiki Scientific wiki dedicated to network theory
New Network Theory International Conference on 'New Network Theory'
Network Workbench: A Large-Scale Network Analysis, Modeling and Visualization Toolkit
 Optimization of the Large Network doi:10.13140/RG.2.2.20183.06565/6
Network analysis of computer networks
Network analysis of organizational networks
Network analysis of terrorist networks
Network analysis of a disease outbreak
Link Analysis: An Information Science Approach (book)
Connected: The Power of Six Degrees (documentary)
 A short course on complex networks
A course on complex network analysis by Albert-László Barabási
The Journal of Network Theory in Finance
Network theory in Operations Research from the Institute for Operations Research and the Management Sciences (INFORMS)

 
Networks
Graph theory

fi:Verkkoteoria